The 2000–01 Nemzeti Bajnokság I, also known as NB I, was the 99th season of top-tier football in Hungary. The league was officially named Borsodi Liga for sponsoring reasons since April 2001. The season started on 22 July 2000 and ended on 23 June 2001.

Overview
It was contested by 16 teams, and Ferencvárosi TC won the championship.

First stage

Group A

League standings

Results

Group B

League standings

Results

Second stage

League standings

Results

Statistical leaders

Top goalscorers

References
Hungary - List of final tables (RSSSF)

Nemzeti Bajnokság I seasons
1
Hungary